The Stuttgart Chamber Orchestra (Stuttgarter Kammerorchester) is a German chamber orchestra based in Stuttgart.

History

Karl Münchinger founded the orchestra in 1945, and served as its chief conductor until 1987. With Münchinger, the orchestra made its USA debut in March 1954 in New York City. Martin Sieghart was the orchestras second chief conductor from 1990 to 1995. From 1995 to 2006, Dennis Russell Davies was chief conductor, and his projects with the orchestra included recordings of Haydn symphonies.

Subsequent chief conductors have included Michael Hofstetter (2006–2013) and Matthias Foremny (2013–2019). In October 2017, the orchestra announced the appointment of Thomas Zehetmair as its next chief conductor, effective with the 2019–2020 season, with an initial contract of three years.

Chief conductors
 Karl Münchinger (1945–1987)
  (1990–1995)
 Dennis Russell Davies (1995–2006)
 Michael Hofstetter (2006–2013)
  (2013–2019)
 Thomas Zehetmair (2019–present)

References

External links
 
 

1945 establishments in Germany
Chamber orchestras
Musical groups established in 1945